Karjalan Sissit (Finnish for Karelian Guerrillas) the main musical project of Markus Pesonen. He combines neoclassical orchestral arrangements with elements of noise, power electronics and dark ambient. Common themes on his records are alcoholism, mental health problems and domestic violence. His current location is Eskilstuna, Sweden, and he works with Peter Bjärgö's Erebus Odora label.

Members
Markus Pesonen
Peter Bjargo
D.F. Bragman
Mikael Lindblom
Per Ahlund

Discography
Karjalan Sissit - 2001
Miserere - 2002
Karjalasta Kajahtaa - 2004
Tanssit On Loppu Nyt - 2006
Fucking Whore Society - 2009
...Want You Dead - 2015

External links 
 http://www.myspace.com/karjalansissit

Swedish electronic music groups